Dellar is a surname. Notable people with the surname include:

David Dellar (1915–1994), Australian politician
Fred Dellar (1931–2021), British music journalist
Kevin Dellar (born 1937), Australian rules footballer
Stan Dellar (1936–2015), Australian politician, son of David